CFD-FASTRAN is a commercial Computational Fluid Dynamics (CFD) software package developed by ESI Group for aerodynamic and aerothermodynamic applications. It employs multiple moving body capability for simulating problems such as missile launch, maneuvering and staging, and aircraft flight dynamics and store separation.

CFD-FASTRAN was used by the Council for Scientific and Industrial Research in South Africa to simulate the release of a missile from the outboard pylon of the BAE Hawk Mk120 at transonic speeds where shockwaves dominate the flowfield. The CFD software was used to calculate the carriage loads, structural dynamic responses from the ejection forces and model the loads on the missile in free-flight.

The CFD software was used to predict supercooled droplet impingement on helicopter blades by the Institute for Aerospace Research. This is a first step towards simulating ice formation on rotating helicopter blades.

CFD-FASTRAN was used to study the aerodynamic performance of a hypersonic vehicle powered by scramjet engines. Flow conditions were simulated at various angles of attack at Mach 5.85.

Two-dimensional numerical flow simulations were performed with CFD-FASTRAN to compare the effects of a combined jet flap and Coanda jet effects a supercritical airfoil. The results showed the combined jet flap provided the best performance.

CFD-FASTRAN was used to simulate flow past helicopter rotors in hover and forward flight conditions. The predictions matched experimental data.

References 

Computational fluid dynamics
Engineering software companies
Physics software